Mohamed ben Hassan, also known as Muhammad III was the Dey of Algiers from 1718, to 1724. He was the successor of Baba Ali I.

Early life 
He was born around 1688. He was of Egyptian Arabic origins. He was an illiterate herder before going to Algiers in his teenage years.

Life in Algiers 
He learned to read and write in Algiers, and was noted for his intelligence. He soon started working on more important jobs, before being appointed treasurer by Baba Ali Chaouch. He strongly supported Ali in his goals of independence from the Ottomans, and he was staunchly against the Odjak of Algiers. After an earthquake in 1716, he helped rebuild the city.

After the death of Ali in 1718, the Divan of Algiers quickly elected him as the Dey as they were worried that without a staunch ruler the Odjak would take over the country.

Dey of Algiers 
After his election he decided to continue the war against the Kingdom of the Netherlands which Baba Ali started. He heavily invested in barbary piracy and strengthened the country's navy. He continued recovering Algiers from the earthquake, mainly through money he salvaged from the barbary slave trade. He supported the Bey of Titteri's Ali Khodja goals of stabilizing Kabylia. He built a bordj (fort) in the valley of the Sebaou river in 1720, and another Bordj in Boghni in 1724. He worked on weakening the power of the Turks over the Odjak of Algiers, and allowed more Kouloughlis and native Algerians to join the unit. He further angered the Turks by keeping a distant relationship from the Ottoman Empire, and replacing Turks in important positions of power with his relatives and well-skilled Algerians.

His death 
On 18 May 1724 while he was performing routine inspections in the dock of Algiers he was attacked by five or six Turkish janissaries, all from the Odjak of Algiers. A Turk suddenly came out of a terras in a house and shot him with a flintlock pistol. Upon this signal several other Turks rushed out of their hiding places and attacked him. He died without speaking a word, knowing that his death was near. After they killed him, the Turks rushed to the Jenina palace to install a dey of their own whom they decided would be the Agha of the sipahis. While barely putting the Kaftan on him, the Noubagis (guards) of the palace shot them with their muskets. The Turkish conspirators retreated, and a new Dey was elected by the Divan of Algiers, Cur Abdy, whom was also heavily against the Odjak.

References 

Deys of Algiers
18th-century Egyptian people
17th-century Egyptian people
17th-century Algerian people
18th-century Algerian people
1734 deaths
18th-century rulers in Africa